The profession of occupational therapy was established in India in 1950. Despite its 70 years of existence in India, the profession has gained momentum in the healthcare sector of India only in the past decade.

Beginning years 

The first department of occupational therapy (OT) was established at the King Edward Memorial Hospital (KEM) in Mumbai, India in 1950.  The founder of the ‘OT profession in India’ as well as the ‘first school of OT in India/Asia’ was Mrs. Kamala V. Nimbkar [1] [nee Elizabeth Lundy].  Mrs. Nimbhkar was a social activist who spent her early 30s at Mahatma Gandhi’s Sabarmati Ashram.  She became interested in OT when she came across an article written by Ms. Helen Willard, a notable occupational therapist in the United States.  Dr. Nimbhkar went  to the US to study OT at the Philadelphia School of OT at the age of 45.  After passing the OT board exam in February 1948 she returned to India and persuaded the KEM Hospital Administration to start the OT department.

Mrs. Nimbkar was also the founder and first president of the All India Occupational Therapists Association, which is one of the founding member organizations of the World Federation of Occupational Therapists (WFOT).  Mrs. Nimbhkar was also the first editor of the Indian Journal of Occupational Therapy in its beginning years.  Mrs. Nimbkar retired in 1957 from the Occupational Therapy School at KEM Hospital and established the second OT school at Nagpur in 1958.

1960–1980s 

Subsequent decades saw the emergence of a few OT diploma educational programs in the states of Bihar [Bihar College of Physiotherapy and Occupational Therapy - 1966], New Delhi [PDU Institute for the Physically Handicapped - 1960; College of Occupational Therapy, AIIMS - 1971], Tamil Nadu [Occupational Therapy School at Christian Medical College - 1969], and Uttar Pradesh [Occupational Therapy School at King George's Medical School - 1970; Occupational Therapy School at Institute of Engineering and Technology - 1981].

Age of notable growth 

Occupational therapy's stature began to grow when diploma level educational programs transitioned to baccalaureate level programs in late 1980s. The last decade of the 20th century was a golden decade for OT in India as 13 new baccalaureate level OT programs were established in India between 1990 and 2000. Many schools were established in Maharashtra and Tamil Nadu.  The number of OT educational programs continued to rise in early 2000.  The length of the baccalaureate degree was increased from 3.5 years to 4.5 years in the late 1990s.  Institutions also began to offer OT at a master's level (ranging 2–3 years) beginning late 1990s.  Since 2012, doctoral level [PhD] OT degrees are also being offered in India.

The demand for OT professionals in India has gathered momentum in the past decade. Indian OT professionals work in a variety of practice settings including government and private hospitals, multi-specialty hospitals, rehabilitation centers, non-governmental organizations, special schools, outpatient clinics, and academic institutions.  Many OTs in India run their own outpatient clinics.  Due to the excessive demand for OT professionals all over the world, graduates of OT programs in India comprise a notable part of India's diaspora.

Entry-level requirements 

To practice OT in India, one must graduate with a baccalaureate level degree in OT (BOT). One must also fulfil other applicable regulatory requirements such as obtaining a registration certificate from the council (if one is established in the state) before starting to practice. Currently, more than 30 schools offer OT courses in India.

Occupational therapy schools in India  
A few well-known institutes that run BOT courses in India are as follows
 Sri Ramachandra University, Chennai, Tamil Nadu
JKKMMRF College of Occupational therapy, Tamil Nadu
NIEPMD, Chennai, Tamil Nadu
 National Institute for locomotor disabilities, Kolkata, West Bengal, India
 All India Institute of Physical Medicine and Rehabilitation, Haji Ali, Mumbai, Maharashtra, India
 Swami Vivekanand National Institute of Rehabilitation Training and Research (SVNIRTAR), Cuttack, Odisha, India
 Pt. Deen Dayal Upadhyay Institute for Physically Handicapped, Delhi
 School of Allied Health Sciences, Manipal, Karnataka, India
 Seth Gordhandas Sunderdas Medical College and King Edward VII Memorial Hospital, Parel East, Mumbai, Maharashtra, India
 Topiwala National Medical College and BYL Nair Charitable Hospital, Mumbai Central, Mumbai, Maharashtra, India
 Christian Medical College, Vellore
 Government Medical College, Nagpur, Maharashtra, India
 KMCH College of Occupational Therapy, Coimbatore
 Dr. D. Y. Patil College of Occupational Therapy, Navi Mumbai, Maharashtra, India
 Dr. D. Y. Patil College of Occupational Therapy, Kolhapur, Maharashtra, India
 School Of Occupational Therapy, Faculty of Allied Health Science, Jamia Hamdard University, New Delhi
 Lokmanya Tilak Municipal Medical College and Lokmanya Tilak Municipal General Hospital, Sion, Mumbai, Maharashtra, India
 Jaipur Occupational Therapy College & Hospital, Jaipur, Rajasthan, India
 Santosh Medical College, Ghaziabad
 Indore Institute of Medical Sciences, Indore, Madhya Pradesh, India
 Ahmedabad Institute of Medical Sciences, Ahmedabad, Gujarat, India
 SRM College of Occupational Therapy, Chennai, Tamil Nadu, India
 NIMS University, Shobha Nagar, Jaipur-303121
Annamalai University, Annamalai Nagar, Tamil Nadu 608 002
 Saveetha University, Chennai, Tamil Nadu
 Meenakshi Academy of Higher Education and Research, Chennai, Tamil Nadu 
smt.K.p.patel institute of p.t.and o.t. (Anand,  Gujarat)
Allied Health Sciences, Goa Medical College, Goa, India
 mahatma Gandhi institute of allied health and science (MAHSI), Indore

Regulating body 
Currently, there is no national level council to regulate the profession of occupational therapy in India. However, efforts are underway to create a national level council.  The All India Occupational Therapists Association offers voluntary registration with its Academic Council for interested OT practitioners in India.  The State of Maharashtra and the Union Territory of Delhi legally require OT practitioners to register themselves with the respective councils (The Delhi Council for Physiotherapy and Occupational Therapy & Maharashtra State Occupational and Physiotherapy Council).

References

External links 
 OT in India

Occupational therapy